The Chronicles of Narnia: The Lion, the Witch and the Wardrobe is a 2005 high fantasy film directed by Andrew Adamson, who co-wrote the screenplay with Ann Peacock, Christopher Markus, and Stephen McFeely, based on the 1950 novel The Lion, the Witch and the Wardrobe, the first published and second chronological novel in the children's book series The Chronicles of Narnia by C. S. Lewis. The film is the first installment in The Chronicles of Narnia film series. It was produced by Walt Disney Pictures and Walden Media, and distributed by Buena Vista Pictures Distribution.

William Moseley, Anna Popplewell, Skandar Keynes, and Georgie Henley play Peter, Susan, Edmund, and Lucy Pevensie, four British children evacuated during the Blitz to the countryside, who find a wardrobe that leads to the fantasy world of Narnia, where they ally with the lion Aslan (voiced by Liam Neeson) against the forces of the White Witch (Tilda Swinton).

The Chronicles of Narnia: The Lion, the Witch and the Wardrobe premiered on 7 December 2005, selected for the Royal Film Performance, before it was theatrically released on 8 December in the United Kingdom and 9 December in the United States. The film received generally positive reviews from critics and was a box office hit, grossing more than $745 million worldwide against a $180 million budget and becoming the third-highest-grossing film of 2005. An extended edition was released on 12 December 2006, on DVD. Combining both releases of the film, in regular and extended edition, it was the third-best-selling and first-highest-grossing DVD in North America in 2006, taking in $332.7 million that year. At the 78th Academy Awards, the film won for Best Makeup and was nominated for Best Sound Mixing and Best Visual Effects, while at the 59th BAFTA Awards, it won for Best Makeup and Hair and was nominated for Best Costume Design and Best Special Visual Effects. The score was nominated for Best Original Score and the song "Wunderkind" by Alanis Morissette was nominated for Best Original Song at the 63rd Golden Globe Awards. The score was also nominated for Best Score Soundtrack Album for Motion Picture, Television or Other Visual Media and the song "Can’t Take It In" by Imogen Heap was nominated for Best Song Written For Motion Picture, Television or Other Visual Media at the 49th Grammy Awards.

The Lion, the Witch and the Wardrobe was followed by Prince Caspian in 2008 and The Voyage of the Dawn Treader in 2010. The three films have grossed a total of over $1.5 billion worldwide.

Plot 

After an air raid during World War II, the Pevensie children (Peter, Susan, Edmund, Lucy) are evacuated from London to the country home of Professor Kirke.

During a game of hide-and-seek, Lucy discovers a wardrobe and hides inside, only to find that she has entered a magical winter world. Lucy finds a lamppost and encounters a faun named Mr. Tumnus, who invites her to his home and tells her she is in Narnia. Tumnus puts Lucy to sleep by playing a flute lullaby, and when Lucy wakes up, he explains that the White Witch cursed Narnia to eternally experience winter and never Christmas; any humans encountered are to be brought to her. Tumnus instead sends Lucy home, where she finds hardly any time had passed, and her siblings disbelieve her story due to the normal state of the wardrobe.

Lucy later returns through the wardrobe, followed by Edmund. Edmund meets the White Witch, who claims to be queen of Narnia. Edmund tells her about his siblings and Tumnus, and the Witch offers him Turkish delight and kingship if he brings his siblings to her castle. After she departs, Edmund and Lucy reunite. Lucy informs Peter and Susan, but Edmund lies out of spite. When Peter and Susan bring the issue to Professor Kirke, he suggests Lucy is telling the truth.

While fleeing the housekeeper after accidentally breaking a window, the four siblings retreat to the wardrobe and enter Narnia. Peter berates Edmund for lying and forces him to apologize to Lucy. They discover that the Witch has taken Tumnus, and they meet a couple of talking beavers, who say Aslan plans to return and regain control of Narnia, and there is a prophecy that says if two sons of Adam and two daughters of Eve sit on the thrones of Cair Paravel, the Witch's reign will end.

Edmund sneaks off to visit the Witch, but she is furious that he came without his siblings. The Witch sends wolves to find the children, and Edmund is imprisoned, where he meets Tumnus. The children and beavers escape, and the Witch demands Edmund reveal their location. Tumnus defends Edmund, but the Witch reveals Edmund's treachery before turning Tumnus to stone.

While Peter, Lucy, Susan, and the beavers travel, they encounter Father Christmas, a sign that the Witch's power is weakening. He gives them tools to defend themselves — Lucy receives a cordial that can heal any injury, and a dagger; Susan receives a magical horn, and a bow and quiver of arrows; and Peter receives a sword and shield. After evading Maugrim's wolves due to the melting ice, the group reaches Aslan's camp, where he is revealed to be a lion who promises to help Edmund. Two wolves ambush Lucy and Susan, but Peter kills Maugrim; Aslan's troops follow the other wolf to the Witch's camp and rescue Edmund.

The White Witch journeys to Aslan's camp to claim Edmund, but Aslan secretly offers himself instead. That night, as Lucy and Susan covertly watch, the White Witch kills Aslan, then deploys an army to slaughter Aslan's troops. Lucy and Susan send a warning, and Edmund persuades Peter to take command. In the morning, both armies violently clash. Aslan is resurrected, citing magic beyond the Witch's understanding, and takes Susan and Lucy to the Witch's castle to free the petrified prisoners. Edmund is mortally wounded while saving Peter from the Witch, but the reinforcements arrive and Aslan kills the Witch. Edmund is healed by Lucy's cordial, and the Pevensies are crowned King Peter the Magnificent, Queen Susan the Gentle, King Edmund the Just, and Queen Lucy the Valiant.

Fifteen years later, the Pevensie children, now adults, pursue a white stag. They encounter the lamppost which Lucy first saw when she entered Narnia. They cross back through the wardrobe, becoming children again. Professor Kirke finds them, asking why they were in the wardrobe.

In a mid-credits scene, Lucy attempts to use the wardrobe, but Professor Kirke tells her he has also tried, and they will probably return to Narnia when they least expect it.

Cast 

 William Moseley as Peter Pevensie, the eldest of the four Pevensie children.
 Noah Huntley as Adult Peter Pevensie, who has grown up as a king in Narnia.
 Anna Popplewell as Susan Pevensie, the second-eldest child of the four Pevensie children.
 Sophie Winkleman as Adult Susan Pevensie, who has grown up as a queen in Narnia.
 Skandar Keynes as Edmund Pevensie, the third and second-youngest of the four Pevensie children.
 Mark Wells as Adult Edmund Pevensie, who has grown up as a king in Narnia.
 Georgie Henley as Lucy Pevensie, the youngest of the four Pevensie children.
 Rachael Henley (Henley's real-life sister) as Adult Lucy Pevensie, who has grown up as a queen in Narnia.
 Liam Neeson as the voice of Aslan, the great lion who was responsible for creating Narnia.
 Tilda Swinton as the White Witch, who holds Narnia under an eternal winter without Christmas or Spring or Summer.
 James McAvoy as Mr. Tumnus, a faun who at first works for the White Witch, but befriends Lucy Pevensie and joins Aslan's forces.
 Jim Broadbent as Professor Digory Kirke, an old professor. He lets the children stay at his country estate during the war.
 Ray Winstone as the voice of Mr. Beaver, a beaver who helps lead the children to Aslan.
 Dawn French as the voice of Mrs. Beaver, a beaver who helps lead the children to Aslan.
 Kiran Shah as Ginarrbrik, the White Witch's servant dwarf.
 Elizabeth Hawthorne as Mrs. Macready, Kirke's strict housekeeper.
 James Cosmo as Father Christmas. He gives Peter, Susan, and Lucy their Christmas gifts.
 Michael Madsen as the voice of Maugrim, a wolf who is captain of the White Witch's secret police.
 Patrick Kake as General Oreius, a centaur who is second-in-command of Aslan's army.
 Shane Rangi as General Otmin, a minotaur who is second-in-command of the White Witch's army.
 Morris Cupton as Train Guard, the guard of the train Peter, Susan, Edmund and Lucy ride.
 Judy McIntosh as Helen Pevensie, the mother of the four Pevensie children.
 Rupert Everett as the voice of Mr. Fox, a fox who helps the children along their way to Aslan.
 Producer Philip Steuer voices Phillip, Edmund's talking horse.

The radio-announcer that Peter listens to on the rainy day near the beginning of the film is played by Douglas Gresham, co-producer of the movie and C. S. Lewis's stepson. Keynes' voice broke during filming, so some of his voice track had to be re-looped by his sister Soumaya. Mr. Pevensie is only glimpsed in a photo which Edmund tries to retrieve during the bombing, which is of Sim-Evan Jones's father.

With the exception of Tilda Swinton, who was the first choice to play Jadis, the White Witch, casting was a long process. Beginning in 2002, Adamson went through 2,500 audition tapes, met 1,800 children and workshopped 400 before coming down to the final four actors for the Pevensies. Moseley and Popplewell came from the very start of casting, whilst Henley and Keynes were cast relatively late. Moseley was cast because casting director Pippa Hall remembered she cast him as an extra in Cider with Rosie (1998). He beat 3,000 boys to the role of Peter and quit school to learn all his lines.

Aslan's voice was a contention point. Brian Cox was originally cast in the role on 9 December 2004, but Adamson changed his mind. Liam Neeson sought out the role, and was announced as the voice on 17 July 2005.

Production

Pre-production 
During the early 1990s, producers Frank Marshall and Kathleen Kennedy were planning a film version. They could not find a space in Britain to shoot the film during 1996, and their plans to set the film in modern times made Douglas Gresham oppose the film, in addition to his feeling that technology had yet to catch up. Perry Moore began negotiations with the C. S. Lewis estate in 2000. On 7 December 2001, Walden Media announced that they had acquired the rights to The Chronicles of Narnia.

The success of Harry Potter and the Philosopher's Stone prompted the producers to feel they could make a faithful adaptation of the novel set in Britain. "Harry Potter came along, and all those cultural or geographical lines were broken," Mark Johnson explained. "When The Lion, The Witch and the Wardrobe was being developed at Paramount, the imperative was to set it in the U.S., and it just doesn't hold. [...] It's not the book." Guillermo del Toro turned down the offer to direct due to his commitment on Pan's Labyrinth. Following an Academy Award win for Shrek, director Andrew Adamson began adapting the source material with a 20-page treatment based on his memories of the book. As such the film begins with the Luftwaffe bombing and concludes with an enormous battle, although they do not take up as much time in the novel.

In the novel, the battle is not seen until Aslan, Susan, Lucy and their reinforcements arrive. This was changed in the movie because Adamson said he could vividly remember a huge battle, an example of how Lewis left a lot to the readers' imagination. Other small changes include the reason all four children come to Narnia, in that an accident breaks a window and forces them to hide. Tumnus also never meets Edmund until the end of the novel. Minor details were added to the Pevensies, such as their mother's name, Helen, being the actual first name of Georgie Henley's mother. Finchley as the home of the Pevensies was inspired by Anna Popplewell, who actually is from Finchley. Adamson also changed the circumstances in which Lucy first comes into Narnia. He felt it was more natural that she first see the wardrobe while looking for a hide-and-seek hiding place, rather than just chance upon it exploring the house. The film also hints at Professor Kirke's role in The Magician's Nephew, such as the engravings on the wardrobe, when it is a simple one in the novel, and the Professor's surprise and intrigue when Peter and Susan mention Lucy's discovery in the wardrobe. When Lewis wrote the novel, it was the first of the series, and the back-story later outlined by the subsequent books in the series did not exist. Additionally, in the novel, the father of the Pevensie children is in London with their mother, but in the film, their father is fighting in the war as Lucy states to Mr. Tumnus when they first meet in Narnia.

Weta Workshop head Richard Taylor cited Hieronymus Bosch's The Garden of Earthly Delights as an inspiration on the film. He felt Narnia had to be less dark and gritty than their depiction of Middle-earth in The Lord of the Rings because it is a new world. Many of Weta's creature designs were designed for digital creation, so when Howard Berger and KNB FX inherited the practical effects work, they had to spend three months retooling approved designs for animatronics. Berger's children would comment and advise upon his designs; they suggested the White Witch's hair be changed from black to blonde, which Berger concurred with as he realized Swinton's wig looked too Gothic.

Filming 
Principal photography began in New Zealand on 28 June 2004, shooting in primarily chronological order. Adamson did this in order to naturally create a sense of mature development from his young actors, which mirrored their real-life development. Georgie Henley and Skandar Keynes were never shown the set before filming scenes of their characters entering Narnia, nor had Henley seen James McAvoy in his Mr. Tumnus costume before shooting their scenes together.

The first scene shot was at the former RNZAF Base Hobsonville for the railway scene. Afterwards, they shot the Blitz scene, which Adamson called their first formal day of shooting.

The filmmakers asked permission to bring in twelve reindeer to New Zealand to pull the White Witch's sled. They were denied by the Ministry of Agriculture and Forestry, citing the potentially deadly Q fever, from which the North American reindeer population suffers, as the reason. However, ten wolves and wolf hybrids were allowed in for filming in Auckland. To replace the denied live reindeer, Mark Rappaport's Creature Effects, Inc. created four animatronic reindeer that were used in shots where the deer were standing in place. The reindeer were designed with replaceable skins to get the most usage; brown for Father Christmas's and white for those of the White Witch.

The cast and crew spent their time in New Zealand in Auckland before moving in November to the South Island. Shooting locations in the South Island included Flock Hill in Canterbury, the area known as Elephant Rocks near Duntroon in North Otago, which was transformed into Aslan's camp. The castle scene was filmed in Purakaunui Bay, in the Catlins district, not far from the most southern point in New Zealand.

They filmed in the Czech Republic (Prague and National Park České Švýcarsko), Slovenia and Poland after the Christmas break, before wrapping in February.

Post-production 
The film was edited by Jim May and Sim Evan-Jones. Jones states that he really liked the problem solving that one can do with editing. According to Sim, "The way you can just take stuff and sort it out and be the keeper of the story without having to interact with actors, crew and reign", is what fascinated him into the editing world.

Jim May had worked at several visual effects facilities—Boss Film, ILM and Sony Pictures Imageworks—and eventually, moved into feature editorial as the visual effects editor in the cutting room.

Music 

The soundtrack was composed by Harry Gregson-Williams, who had previously worked with Adamson on Shrek (2001) and Shrek 2 (2004). In addition there are three original songs in the film; "Can't Take It In" by Imogen Heap, "Wunderkind" by Alanis Morissette and "Winter Light" by Tim Finn. Evanescence lead singer Amy Lee also wrote a song for the film, but it was not included in the soundtrack.

The soundtrack was recorded at Abbey Road Studios, London, England, and in Los Angeles, California. Gregson-Williams employed the 75-piece Hollywood Studio Symphony Orchestra, along with a 140-member choir (mostly members of the Bach Choir) and numerous other solo musicians such as electric violinist Hugh Marsh and vocalist Lisbeth Scott (at his Wavecrest Studio). He composed the original score and then spent late September through early November 2005 conducting the Hollywood Orchestra and overseeing the recording of the English choir. For "colour", he employed instruments used in ancient folk music, and to underscore critical dramatic moments, he added choral textures and, occasionally, a solo voice. The score includes instances of electronic music.

The soundtrack received two Golden Globe Award nominations, Best Original Score and Best Original Song (for "Wunderkind").

EMI also released a compilation soundtrack entitled Music Inspired by The Chronicles of Narnia: The Lion, the Witch and the Wardrobe was released in September 2005. The album features songs by contemporary Christian music artists, such as Bethany Dillon, Kutless, and Nichole Nordeman. It released "Waiting for the World to Fall" by Jars of Clay as a single. The album went on to win the Special Event Album of the Year at the GMA Music Awards.

Another song inspired by the movie is "Lazy Sunday" (also known as "The Narnia rap") by the Lonely Island and Chris Parnell. The song and its music video was released as a comedy sketch in an 2005 episode of the TV show, Saturday Night Live. The song and its video are both a spoof of hardcore rap songs. In "Lazy Sunday", Parnell and Lonely Island member Andy Samberg rap about among other things, going to see The Chronicles of Narnia at an afternoon matinee. The joke is that the song's lyrics are not typical for hardcore rap, which normally depicts scenes of crime and violence. Samberg himself describes "Lazy Sunday" as "two guys rapping about very lame, sensitive stuff." Both the song and its video became an overnight hit, surprising its creators. "Lazy Sunday" is credited with helping revive Saturday Night Live which was stagnant in the years before the song's release. Several bootleg copies of "Lazy Sunday" were uploaded to the video-sharing YouTube, which had only launched earlier in the year, where they were very popular and gained a combined total of five million views (a very large number for an online video at the time). The video's popularity brought widespread attention to YouTube and kick started the site's success, quickly becoming the most popular video website on the internet and one of the most popular websites overall, remaining so as of the early 2020s.

Reception

Release 
On 7 December 2005, the film had its world premiere in London as the 59th Royal Film Performance, an event held in aid of The Film and Television Charity. The event took place at the Royal Albert Hall and was attended by the then Prince of Wales and Duchess of Cornwall. The film was released 8 December 2005, in the United Kingdom and 9 December 2005, in North America and the rest of Europe.

Box office 
Worldwide, Narnia earned $745,013,115 marking it the 55th-highest-grossing film of all time worldwide. It had a worldwide opening of $107.1 million, marking Disney's fifth-largest opening worldwide (at the time it was the largest). It is the third-largest movie worldwide among those released in 2005 and it currently still remains the highest-grossing movie of the Narnia franchise worldwide, and separately in North America and overseas. Finally, it is also the most successful film of Walden Media worldwide.

United States and Canada 

The film opened with $23,006,856 on around 6,800 screens at 3,616 theatres on its opening day (Friday, 9 December 2005), averaging $6,363 per theater or $3,383 per screen. The film took in a total of $65,556,312 on its opening weekend (9–11 December 2005), the 24th-best opening weekend at the time (now 54th). It was also Disney's third-largest opening weekend at the time (now the 34th-largest) as well as the second-biggest December opening, behind The Lord of the Rings: The Return of the King. It is now fourth following the 2012 opening of The Hobbit: An Unexpected Journey, the 2007 release of I Am Legend, and the 2009 release of Avatar as well. Additionally, it made the third-largest opening weekend of 2005. It grossed $291,710,957 in total becoming the second-highest-grossing film of 2005 behind Star Wars: Episode III – Revenge of the Sith. It surpassed the gross of Harry Potter and the Goblet of Fire by only $1.7 million, although the latter grossed $895.9 million worldwide, ahead of The Lion, the Witch and the Wardrobe. It is the highest-grossing film of the 2005 holiday period, the second-highest-grossing Christian film, the sixth-largest family–children's book adaptation, the ninth-highest-grossing fantasy–live-action film and the 10th-highest-grossing film overall in Disney company history. Finally, it is the largest film of Walden Media worldwide. Box Office Mojo estimates that the film sold over 45 million tickets in North America.

Critical reception 
On Rotten Tomatoes, the film has an approval rating of 76% based on 217 reviews, with an average rating of 7.00/10. The site's critical consensus reads, "With first-rate special effects and compelling storytelling, this adaptation stays faithful to its source material and will please moviegoers of all ages." On Metacritic the film holds an average weighted score of 75 out of 100, based on 39 critics, indicating "generally favorable reviews". CinemaScore reported that audiences gave the film a rare "A+" grade.

Critic Roger Ebert gave the film 3 out of 4 stars. Ebert and Roeper gave the movie "Two Thumbs Up". Movie critic Leonard Maltin gave the film 3 out of four stars, calling it, "an impressive and worthwhile family film," though he also said, "it does go on a bit and the special effects are extremely variable." Duane Dudak of the Milwaukee Journal Sentinel gave the movie 3 out of 4 stars. Stuart Klawans of The Nation said, "All ticket buyers will get their money's worth." Elizabeth Weitzman of New York Daily News gave it 4 out of 4 stars and said: "A generation-spanning journey that feels both comfortingly familiar and excitingly original." Critic Mick LaSalle of the San Francisco Chronicle listed it as the second best film of the year. Kit Bowen gave the film 3 out of 4 stars.

However, John Anderson from Newsday, reacted negatively to the film, stating, "…there's a deliberateness, a fastidiousness and a lack of daring and vision that marks the entire operation."

Accolades 
The Lion, the Witch and the Wardrobe won several awards including the Academy Award for Best Makeup; the BeliefNet Film Award for Best Spiritual film; the Movieguide Faith & Values Awards: Most Inspiring Movie of 2005 and Best Family Movie of 2005; and the CAMIE (Character and Morality In Entertainment) Award. Others include the British Academy Film Awards for Makeup and Hair and Orange Rising Star (James McAvoy); Outstanding Motion Picture, Animated or Mixed Media; the Phoenix Film Critics Society Award for Best Performance by a Youth in a Lead or Supporting Role (Georgie Henley, Female); the Costume Designers Guild Award for Excellence in Fantasy Film (Isis Mussenden); and the Saturn Award for Costumes (Isis Mussenden) and Make-up (Howard Berger, Greg Nicotero, and Nikki Gooley).

Georgie Henley received critical acclaim for her performance as Lucy Pevensie. She won several awards, including the Phoenix Film Critics Society award for Best Actress in a Leading Role and Best Performance by a Youth. She also won other awards either for Best Young Performance or Best Actress in a Leading Role.

Home media release 
The DVD for The Chronicles of Narnia: The Lion, the Witch and the Wardrobe was released on 4 April 2006. It is available in a standard one-disc set (with separate full-screen and widescreen editions), and a deluxe widescreen two-disc boxed set with additional artwork and other materials from Disney and Walden Media. The DVD sold four million copies on its first day of release and overtook Harry Potter and the Goblet of Fire to become the top-selling DVD in North America for 2006. As of December 2008 it has grossed $353.5 million in DVD sales, equivalent to 12,458,637 units sold.

Disney later issued a four-disc extended cut of the film on DVD. It was released on 12 December 2006, and was available commercially until 31 January 2007, after which Disney put the DVD on moratorium. The extended cut of the film runs approximately 150 minutes. The set includes all of the features previously released on the two-disc special edition. The two additional discs include a segment called "The Dreamer of Narnia", a previously unreleased feature-length film about C. S. Lewis, and additional production featurettes. Most of the extended footage, besides the extended battle sequence, is longer establishing shots of Narnia and footage of the Pevensies walking in Narnia.

The high-definition Blu-ray Disc version was released on 13 May 2008, in the United States, and on 16 June 2008, in the United Kingdom.

References

External links 

 
 
 
 
 
 

2005 films
2000s fantasy adventure films
2000s American films
BAFTA winners (films)
The Chronicles of Narnia (film series)
Films about Christianity
Films about royalty
Films about siblings
Films directed by Andrew Adamson
Films scored by Harry Gregson-Williams
Films set in 1940
Films set in London
Films shot in New Zealand
Films shot in the Czech Republic
Films shot in Poland
Films set in castles
Films that won the Academy Award for Best Makeup
High fantasy films
Films with screenplays by Andrew Adamson
Films with screenplays by Christopher Markus and Stephen McFeely
Santa Claus in film
Walden Media films
Walt Disney Pictures films
Films about witchcraft
Fauns in popular culture
American children's fantasy films
2000s English-language films
2000s British films